The World RX of the United States is a Rallycross event held in United States for the FIA World Rallycross Championship. The event made its debut in the 2018 season, at the Circuit of the Americas in the town of Austin, Texas.

Past winners

References

United States
Auto races in the United States